Glaúber Alceu da Silva (born October 1, 1981) is a former Brazilian professional footballer.

Club career

Atlético Marte
Da Silva signed with Atlético Marte of the Salvadoran Primera División in 2010.

Águila
Da Silva signed with Águila in 2011. With the team of San Miguel, Da Silva won the Clausura 2012 final against Isidro Metapán (2–1 victory), on 6 May 2012. In that final, he got injured and was replaced by Henry Romero.

Once Municipal
Da Silva signed with Once Municipal for the Apertura 2012. Once Municipal finished in the tenth position of the league table with only 5 points.

Halcones FC
After leaving Once Municipal, Da Silva signed with Halcones FC of Guatemala.

Istiklol
In 2013, he joined FC Istiklol of Tajikistan.

Pasaquina
Da Silva signed with Pasaquina for the Clausura 2015. With the team of La Union, Da Silva played 28 games.

Honours

Club 
FC Istiklol
 Tajik Cup (1): 2013

C.D. Águila
 Primera División
 Champion: Clausura 2012

References

1981 births
Living people
Brazilian footballers
Expatriate footballers in El Salvador
C.D. Águila footballers
FC Istiklol players
Once Municipal footballers
Expatriate footballers in Portugal
Expatriate footballers in Tajikistan
Association football defenders
Tajikistan Higher League players